Barry Kenneth Long (born January 3, 1949) is a Canadian former professional ice hockey player and coach.

Long began his career with the Moose Jaw Canucks of the Saskatchewan Junior Hockey League, and then played with the Central Hockey League's Dallas Black Hawks. Coveted as a third line defensive forward, Long signed with the Los Angeles Kings of the National Hockey League in 1972. Seeking a more offensive role, after two years with the team, he signed with the Edmonton Oilers of the World Hockey Association. He scored 20 goals in 1974-75 and was a second team all star for the league. After one more solid season with Edmonton, he was traded to the Winnipeg Jets. A physical, gritty forward with soft hands, Long was again a second team all star in the WHA's last year before its merger with the NHL.

In the draft that followed the merger, Long was claimed by the Detroit Red Wings. After one year with this club, he returned to the Jets, playing one full season before suffering a career ending injury five games into the 1981-82 campaign. Upon retirement, he became a Winnipeg assistant, and during the 1983-84 season, he became head coach. In 1984-85, Long's club finished with 96 points and won a first round playoff series, but a poor start during the next campaign led to his firing after 66 games.

Career statistics

Regular season and playoffs

International

Coaching record

References

External links

1949 births
Living people
Canadian ice hockey defencemen
Dallas Black Hawks players
Detroit Red Wings players
Edmonton Oilers (WHA) players
Ice hockey people from Alberta
Los Angeles Kings players
Ottawa Senators scouts
Portland Buckaroos players
San Jose Sharks scouts
Sportspeople from Red Deer, Alberta
Winnipeg Jets (1972–1996) coaches
Winnipeg Jets (1979–1996) players
Winnipeg Jets (1972–1996) scouts
Winnipeg Jets (WHA) players
Canadian ice hockey coaches